Claude Boileau (born December 2, 1933) was a Canadian professional hockey player who played 656 games in the Eastern Hockey League with the New Haven Blades and Long Island Ducks.

External links
 

1933 births
Living people
Ice hockey people from Montreal
New Haven Blades players
Long Island Ducks (ice hockey) players
Canadian ice hockey centres